The Swingin' Best of Asleep at the Wheel is a compilation album by American country band Asleep at the Wheel. Released on October 27, 1992 by Epic Records, it contains select tracks from the group's three albums on Epic: 1974's Asleep at the Wheel, 1987's 10 and 1988's Western Standard Time.

Reception

AllMusic awarded The Swingin' Best of Asleep at the Wheel four out of five stars.

Track listing

Personnel
Hollis Flatt – mastering
M.C. Rather – mastering
Bill Johnson – art direction
Jennifer Gibbs – design
Rollow Welch – design
Antonin Kratochvil – photography

References

External links

Asleep at the Wheel albums
1992 compilation albums
Epic Records compilation albums